Parnassos Strovolou is a Cypriot sports club based in Strovolos, located in the Nicosia District. It has Badminton, Handball and Tennis team. Previous it had Association football and Futsal team. The association football team had 2 participations in Cypriot Fourth Division.

Hounors 
Futsal
 Cypriot Futsal First Division:
 Winner (2): 2005–06, 2007–08
 Cypriot Futsal Cup:
 Winner (1): 2006
 Cyprus Futsal League Cup:
 Winner (1): 2006

References

Multi-sport clubs in Cyprus
Football clubs in Cyprus
Association football clubs established in 1957
1957 establishments in Cyprus
Futsal clubs in Cyprus
Cypriot handball clubs